Yossi Fliker (born November 7, 1989) is an Israeli footballer who plays for Shimshon Bnei Tayibe.

External links
 
 

1989 births
Living people
Israeli Jews
Israeli footballers
Hakoah Maccabi Ramat Gan F.C. players
Hapoel Tzafririm Holon F.C. players
Hapoel Nir Ramat HaSharon F.C. players
Maccabi Ironi Bat Yam F.C. players
Hapoel Ashkelon F.C. players
Hapoel Kfar Shalem F.C. players
Maccabi Jaffa F.C. players
Hapoel Marmorek F.C. players
Sektzia Ness Ziona F.C. players
F.C. Shikun HaMizrah players
Bnei Jaffa F.C. players
Maccabi Ironi Ashdod F.C. players
Hapoel Nahlat Yehuda F.C. players
Liga Leumit players
Footballers from Rishon LeZion
Association football forwards